Isaac Baldwin (July 4, 1790 – September 5, 1853) was an American politician who served as the Mayor of Newark from 1845 to 1846.

References

1790 births
1853 deaths
Mayors of Newark, New Jersey
New Jersey Whigs
19th-century American politicians
Place of birth missing